Robert Nix (November 8, 1944  May 20, 2012) was an American drummer best known as a founding member of the rock band Atlanta Rhythm Section (ARS).  A member of ARS from 1971-1979, he co-wrote several of their songs including the top-ten hits "So Into You" and "Imaginary Lover".

Nix grew up in Jacksonville, Florida and graduated from Paxon Senior High School in 1962.  He got his start as a member of Roy Orbison's backing band The Candymen, and also played on recordings for artists including The Classics IV, Lynyrd Skynyrd, and Al Kooper. Nix also co-wrote songs for other artists, including Billy Joe Royal's "Cherry Hill Park" and B. J. Thomas' "Mighty Clouds of Joy".

In later years Nix suffered from diabetes and multiple myeloma, and died on May 20, 2012, at Baptist Memorial Hospital in Memphis, Tennessee, from complications following surgery the previous month. He was 67.

External links
 Sept 2008 "Bands of Dixie" article by Robert Nix
 Nov 2008 "Bands of Dixie" interview with Robert Nix
 Obituary at Ultimate Classic Rock
 Obituary at Jacksonville.com
 Obituary from Wells Funeral Home

1944 births
2012 deaths
American rock drummers
Atlanta Rhythm Section members